Thomas Ray Mobley Sr. (April 20, 1892 – May 13, 1964) was an American college athletic coach and athletic director. He served in a number of head coaching roles at the University of Louisiana at Lafayette–then known as Southwest Louisiana Institute–including head football (1916, 1919, 1921–1930), basketball (1921–1925), and baseball (1922–1927).

Mobley played college football at Louisiana State University (LSU), lettering from 1913 to 1914. He served in the United States Army during World War II, attaining the rank of captain. He was an officer in the Reserve Corps of the Army in 1920.

Mobley was the department commander of the American Legion in Louisiana from 1931 to 1932. He died on May 13, 1964, at a hospital in Pineville, Louisiana.

Head coaching record

References

1892 births
1954 deaths
American football centers
American football guards
Louisiana Ragin' Cajuns athletic directors
Louisiana Ragin' Cajuns baseball coaches
Louisiana Ragin' Cajuns football coaches
Louisiana Ragin' Cajuns men's basketball coaches
LSU Tigers football players
United States Army officers
United States Army personnel of World War I
People from Coushatta, Louisiana
Coaches of American football from Louisiana
Players of American football from Louisiana
Baseball coaches from Louisiana
Basketball coaches from Louisiana
Military personnel from Louisiana